Ali Messaoudi (born 13 October 1995) is an Algerian steeplechase runner. He is finalist of world junior championship in Eugene 2014 ,   He is U23 Mediterranean champion 2016 in Tunisia , then He competed at the 2016 Summer Olympics, but was disqualified in the heats, in 2017 he participated in the French championship of cross country and got third (3) place in the same year he go to 29th university games in Taipei  and he got third (3) place in the final.

References

External links 
 

1995 births
Living people
Algerian male steeplechase runners
Olympic athletes of Algeria
Athletes (track and field) at the 2016 Summer Olympics
Universiade medalists in athletics (track and field)
Universiade bronze medalists for Algeria
Medalists at the 2017 Summer Universiade
21st-century Algerian people
20th-century Algerian people